Adam Smolarczyk (born 12 May 1994) is a Polish volleyball player.

Sporting achievements 
 National championships
 2019/2020  Polish SuperCup, with Grupa Azoty ZAKSA Kędzierzyn-Koźle

References

External links
 1Liga.PLS profile
 Volleybox profile
 SMSSpala profile 
 PlusLiga player profile

1994 births
People from Tarnowskie Góry
Living people
Polish men's volleyball players
ZAKSA Kędzierzyn-Koźle players